A platter is a large type of dishware used for serving food. It is a tray on which food is displayed and served to people. Its shape can be oval, round, rectangular, or square. It can be made of metal, ceramic, plastic, glass or wood. Plain and ornate platters suitable for more formal settings or occasions are made of, or plated with, silver, and antique examples are considered quite valuable. Especially expensive and ceremonial platters have been made of gold.

See also
 Nantaimori

Tableware